"Same Ole Love (365 Days A Year)" is a song by American R&B artist Anita Baker. The song was released as a single to support her multi-platinum album, Rapture.

Chart performance
"Same Ole Love" peaked at #8 on Billboard's Hot Black Singles and #6 on Billboard's Adult Contemporary Singles. It was also a #44 pop hit on the Billboard Hot 100 charts in 1987.

Charts

References

External links
 www.AnitaBaker.com

1987 singles
Anita Baker songs
Songs written by Marilyn McLeod
1986 songs
Elektra Records singles
Song recordings produced by Michael J. Powell